The 2018 ABL Playoffs is the postseason tournament concluding the 2017–18 season of the ASEAN Basketball League (ABL). The top two teams that had the best regular season records qualified directly to the semifinals, while the third to sixth best teams faced each other in the quarterfinals. The quarterfinals and the semifinals will be a best-of-three series, while the Finals is a best-of-five series. The higher-seed team holds the home court advantage, hosting Games 1 and 3 in the semifinals, and Games 1, 2 and 5 in the Finals.

Qualified teams
 Hong Kong Eastern
 Chong Son Kung Fu
 San Miguel Alab Pilipinas
 Mono Vampire
 Singapore Slingers
 Saigon Heat

Bracket

Quarterfinals

Alab vs. Saigon
All times local; UTC+8 for the Philippines and UTC+7 for Vietnam.

Mono vs. Singapore
All times local; UTC+8 for Singapore, and UTC+7 for Thailand

Semifinals

Chong Son vs. Mono
All times local; UTC+8 for China, and UTC+7 for Thailand

Eastern vs. Alab 
All times local, at UTC+8.

Finals

All times local; UTC+8 for the Philippines, and UTC+7 for Thailand

References

2017–18 ABL season
ASEAN Basketball League playoffs
ABL Playoffs
April 2018 sports events in the Philippines
May 2018 sports events in China
May 2018 sports events in the Philippines